Pradal Serey ("free fighting") or Kun Khmer ("Khmer boxing") is a combat sport that originated in Cambodia.  The official Khmer name of the sport is Kbach Kun Pradal Khmer. The sport consists of stand up striking and clinch fighting where the objective is to knock an opponent out, force a technical knockout, or win a match by points.

Pradal Serey is most well known for its kicking technique, which generates power from hip rotation rather than snapping the leg. Pradal Serey consists of four types of strikes: punches, kicks, elbows and knee strikes. The clinch is used to wear down the opponent. In the clinch, opponents battle for dominant position for short range strikes by way of elbows and knees. Cambodian fighters tend to utilize more elbow strikes than that of other martial arts in the region.

History

The story of Pradal Serey starts with the Khmer Empire, founded in 802 A.D. In the Angkor era, both armed and unarmed martial arts were practiced by the Khmers. Evidence shows that a style resembling pradal serey existed in the 9th century, which may be one of the reasons why the Khmer Empire was once a military powerhouse in Southeast Asia. The Khmer Empire used an early form of pradal serey along with various weapons and war elephants to wage war against their main enemies, the principalities of Champa. 

At this time, the Khmer Empire dominated and controlled most of what is now Cambodia, Laos, Thailand and parts of Vietnam. As a result, Cambodia has influenced much of Thai and Lao culture. This leads the Khmer to assert all Southeast Asian forms of boxing started with the early Mon-Khmer people. The basis of this statement is oral stories from their ancestors supplemented with the bas-reliefs/stone carving in the ancient temples of the Bayon, Banteay Chhmar and other Angkor temples that predate the existence of neighboring nations. Much of the writing on ancient Khmer art has been destroyed by the invading Thai armies when the Siamese sacked and looted Angkor.

Pradal serey matches were organized for big event such as festivals.  Sometimes, there were matches to select bodyguards for the Royal Palace.  The competitions usually took place during the dry season when the farmers were done working on their fields.  During the colonial period, martial arts like pradal serey were considered by the European colonists to be brutal and uncivilized. The French turned the art into a sport by adding timed rounds, a boxing ring and western boxing gloves in an attempt to lessen injury. Originally matches were fought in dirt pits with limited rules while hands were wrapped in rope. Some matches had boxers wrap seashells around their knuckles to increase the damage that could be inflicted. Matches ending in death were not uncommon. In the 1960s, Cambodian boxing promoters held inter-martial art exhibitions.

Downfall and revival of pradal serey

During the chaos of the Vietnam War, Cambodia was undergoing its own civil war. On April 17, 1975, the Maoist Communist rebels, the Khmer Rouge, overthrew the government of the Khmer Republic led by Lon Nol. The Khmer Rouge's plan was to eliminate modern society and create an agrarian utopia. The Khmer Rouge executed educated people, others who had ties to the old government or anyone who was believed to be advantaged by the old society (doctors, teachers, soldiers, actors, singers, boxers, etc.) and forced the remaining Khmer population into labor camps, in which many died of starvation and diseases, to be re-educated under the new government. Traditional martial arts were banned at this time and many boxers were executed or worked to death, which nearly caused the death of pradal serey. An estimated 1.7 million Cambodians or 21% of the population died during the Khmer Rouge regime according to the studies of the Cambodia Genocide Program of Yale University. This lasted for four years until 1979 when the Vietnamese along with ex-Khmer Rouge officers, including current prime minister Hun Sen, overthrew the Khmer Rouge. During the relative peace since the departure of the Vietnamese and the re-establishment of the Kingdom of Cambodia, the country's traditional arts were revived, including pradal serey.

Pradal serey is making a strong comeback since its prohibition in the 1970s. Cambodia is making an attempt to market their style of boxing at the same caliber as other martial arts even though its status as a fourth world country renders a lack of financial funding. Numerous gyms have opened and large masses of students, local and foreign, have come to train in Cambodia. There are weekly matches held, the majority televised live, and many of Cambodia's best have traveled internationally to compete. There are currently approximately 70 boxing clubs nationwide. In 1987, one of the first pradal serey schools abroad opened in the United States. It was started by a former national champion by the name of Oumry Ban in Cambodia Town, Long Beach, California.

Pradal serey is administered in Cambodia by the Cambodian Boxing Federation (CBF), formerly the Cambodian Amateur Boxing Federation (CABF), which was established in 1961. All referees, judges and fighters must be licensed by the CABF. Television stations which hold Khmer boxing tournaments do so under the supervision of the CBF. The individual stations are responsible for organizing boxers, trainers, medical staff and musicians. The CBF supplies the match referees, judges and time-keepers. The current president of the CBF is Major-General Tem Moeun. Abroad, Cambodian boxing is promoted by four organizations. These organizations include the European Khmer Boxing Federation based in Germany, the Fédération des Arts Martiaux Khmers also called FAMK, based in France, the Anh Binh Minh Khmer Martial Arts Association in Vietnam and Kun Khmer Australia based in Australia. Other newly created organizations can be found in Spain and Italy, while Belgium is in the process of forming its own Khmer boxing organization.  The International Sport Kickboxing Association based in the United Kingdom have held matches involving Cambodian boxers. Khmer boxers have fought abroad in countries such as Korea.

There have been concerns about the betting and rowdiness among pradal serey fans. Cambodian trainer Chiit Sarim had this to say about the difference between the boxing scene then and now, "I traveled from pagoda to pagoda to box at competitions during the water festival. Pagodas were the traditional venue for boxing matches... They [the current fans] act inappropriately. They raise up their hands and scream noisily. They gamble and do not respect the boxers. They think of only winning their bet. During my time, there was no such thing. Fights were organized nicely and were very popular. Now fans have no morality".

Tournaments are screened live on national television. TV5 Cambodia holds live tournaments on Friday and Sunday, CTN holds live tournaments on Friday, Saturday and Sunday. Bayon Television holds live kickboxing tournaments on Saturday and Sunday, while TV3 holds a single tournament on Sunday and Apsara TV has added a single tournament on Thursday.

Recent exposure to pradal serey in the western world have come from travel journalists and tourists. In addition, pradal serey was featured on The History Channel's Human Weapon and mentioned on the Cambodian episode of Globetrekker. In February, 2009, American footballer Dhani Jones filmed an episode of his series Dhani Tackles the Globe in Phnom Penh, training with Long Salavorn at the Salavorn Keila club and fighting Pan Phanith at the CTN arena.

Songchai Ratanasuban, the number one promoter in Thailand, brought his S1 Promotion to Phnom Penh in June 2005. In the Cambodian S1 World Championship, Bun Sothea won the tournament. He defeated Michael Paszowski, Dzhabar Askerov and Lor Samnang in front of 30,000 people at the Phnom Penh National Olympic Stadium.

In 2008 Cambodian Television Network (CTN) screened a pradal serey reality television series called Kun Khmer Champion. The show featured 65 kilogramme boxers and was produced by Ma Serey and Aaron Leverton and co-hosted by Ma Serey and Cambodia's most famous kickboxer, Eh Phoutong. The first series was followed by a second in 2009 and a third in 2010, both co-hosted by Vorn Viva.

On August 28, 2008, Cambodian boxers Vorn Viva and Meas Chantha won the ISKA Middleweight and Welterweight world titles in Phnom Penh. It was the first time a Cambodian had held a kickboxing world title.

As of 2012, there are over 50 Kun Khmer fights held every week in the Phnom Penh region.

Attempt to unite boxing styles
Nearby Southeast Asian countries have similar styles of boxing martial arts.  At an ASEAN meeting in 1995, Cambodia suggested that the boxing style made popular from Thailand, Muay Thai, be referred to as "Sovannaphum boxing" or "SEA Boxing", which represented Thailand, Cambodia, Laos and Myanmar. Sovannaphum means "golden land" in Khmer and is written as Suwannabhumi in Thai. The name refers to mainland Southeast Asia in the Indian language of Pali.  The aim was to unite the styles of Southeast Asian boxing under a universal term and to avoid a politically incorrect misnomer.

Thailand would not compromise, stating that each Southeast Asian country has its own boxing style and that Thailand was responsible for making its boxing style an international sport. When the sport debuted at the 2005 Southeast Asian Games, Cambodia did not enter the Muay Thai event in protest of the name used to refer to the sport.  At recent Southeast Asian Games, Southeast Asian boxing has been known by the ethnic neutral term of "Muay".

At the 2023 Southeast Asian Games, host Cambodia plans to organize Muay events under the term "Kun Khmer", a move which was protested by Thailand.

Life as a boxer
Pradal Serey is an athletic sport that relies on agility, toughness and flexibility. Most participants are young adults due to the physical conditioning that a boxer must endure to keep their body in shape. The average age ranges from 14 to 25.  Most Cambodian boxers come from a poor background and compete to earn money to feed their families and themselves.  Top kickboxers can have as many as 200–300 fights in their careers.

Cambodian boxers were traditionally paid by the crowd. If the crowd appreciated the boxer's efforts, they would reward him with food, alcohol and cash. This practice still continues today but, in line with western practice, bouts pay official fees. Until recently the average purse for a fight was US$15. Today purses are based on experience. A new Cambodian boxer can earn US$25 per fight. More experienced kick boxers with more than a dozen fights can earn up to $75. "Brand name" kickboxers can earn over $100 a fight. Special purse fights will pay up to $250 with the purse contributed by a corporate sponsor. "International" tournaments, organised by the broadcasters, will pay individual purses of up to $1000, sometimes higher.

An estimated 70% of boxers in the Phnom Penh circuit come from the rural northwest. The provinces of Battambang and Banteay Meanchey produce a steady supply of boxers. Some of the best Pradal Serey champions come from the Battambang Province although a number of big name stars have come via Southern Cambodia such as Eh Phoutong from Koh Kong Province, Thun Sophea from Svay Rieng Province and Meas Chantha and Seng Makara from Kandal Province. Cambodian boxers train in a gym under a Pradal Serey kru. Many boxers train 6–8 hours a day and 7 days a week.

Health risk

As with all contact sports, health risks are a factor. According to Chhoeung Yavyen, a ringside doctor for the Cambodian Amateur Boxing Association, in the past five years 30 kick boxers have sustained serious injury in the ring including broken wrists and arms, broken shins, broken noses, dislodged shoulders, hip injuries and broken jaws.  One Cambodian boxer died in the ring in Svay Rieng Province in 2001, but that death was the result of a heart attack, probably brought on by diet pills consumed to help the boxer reduce his weight before the bout. Most of the injuries suffered are curable and don't leave lasting problems. Most boxers are allowed to return to the ring after receiving treatment.

Rules and match setup

A match consists of five three-minute rounds and takes place in a 6.1 meter square boxing ring.  A one-and-a-half or two-minute break occurs between each round.  In olden times, ancient Khmer people would do praying rituals before going to the battlefield or war.
  At the beginning of each match the boxers practice the praying rituals known as the kun kru or thvayobangkoum krou.  There are different variations of the thvayobangkoum krou ritual with different names such as "Hanuman ties the bridge to Sita".  There are 17 different variations of the ritual.  Most are based on the main characters of the Reamker story and believe to have occurred when Cambodia had a strong belief in Hinduism.  The pre-competition teacher offering ritual also serves to warm the muscle and increase blood flow.
The praying ritual at the preliminaries of the boxing match is considered a real dance. Traditional Cambodian music performed with the instruments of the sampho (a type of drum), the sralai klang khek (oboe) and the chhing is played during the match.  The music of Khmer boxing is called vung phleng pradall or vung phleng klang khek.  The music is made up of two sections.  The first section is for the boxer's teachers while the second section is the fight music.  The first part uses a spirit(teacher) to help the boxers concentrate their minds and have confidence.  The first part of the music is played slowly in a rubato style.  The melody is played by the sralai(oboe) and the sampho(drum) plays strokes at important points of the melody.  The second part which is the fight music is played much faster and in meter.  The music accelerates with the progression of the round.  It stops at the end of the round or when someone is knocked out.  When the fight is exciting, the audience claps in rhythm with the beat of the sampho(drum).
  Modern boxers wear leather gloves and nylon shorts.

Rules:
 A boxer is not allowed to strike his opponent while he is on the ground.
 A boxer is not allowed to bite.
 When an opponent cannot continue, the referee stops the fight.
 Blows to the back of the opponent are not allowed.
 A boxer may not hold on to the ropes.
 Blows to the genitals are prohibited.

Victory can be obtained by knockout.  A knockout occurs when a boxer is knocked down to the ground and cannot continue fighting after a 10-second count by the referee, a referee may forgo the count and declare a knockout if it is obvious the boxer will not regain his feet unaided. Victory can be obtained at the end of the match when judges decide by a point system which fighter was more effective. If fighters end up with the same score a draw is called.

Promoters
Cambodian Television Network
Bayon Television
TV5 Cambodia

Notable Kun Khmer boxers
 Eh Phuthong: TV5 Champion, Khmer Traditional Kickboxing Champion, Prime Minister Samdech Hun Sen champion
 Yuth Phouthorng: Koh Kong Province governor and original teacher of Eh Phoutong
 Thun Sophea: 2006 CTN 67 kg kickboxing champion
 Bun Sothea: Two time Kubota Champion(54 kg and 60 kg). Student of Thun Sophea.
 Chan Rothana: Owner of Selapak gym and current ONE Championship fighter
 Keo Rumchong: Kun Khmer fighter competitor fighting out of Battambang, Cambodia
 Oumry Ban: Former Kun Khmer Champion to held the first national title in 1964 at 61 kilograms and current owner of Long Beach Kickboxing Center
 Sen Radath: Current Kun Khmer fighter and Vovinam Cambodia team fighting at 51 kilograms. He is a YouTube vlogger showing the art of Kun Khmer to his viewers.

Image gallery

See also
Boxing
Kickboxing
Karate
Boxe Française
Khmer Traditional Wrestling

References

Further reading
 Vongs, Moul. "Khmer Boxing", Leisure Cambodia, December 2001, retrieved May 27, 2013.
 The Associated Press. "Cambodia to boycott Thai boxing even over name row", Turkish Daily News, October 23, 1999, retrieved November 4, 2006.
 Sieng-You, Thearon. "Boxing Khmère ", Writing of Angkor N°5 via Les Jeunes Khmers, retrieved November 4, 2006.
 Mallon, Scott. "Back on their feet" The Irrawaddy, March 2005, retrieved November 4, 2006.

External links

 European Khmer Boxing Federation
 Fédération des Arts martiaux Khmers

Cambodian martial arts
Combat sports